Hassan Al-Thawadi is a Qatari lawyer who was the Secretary General at Supreme Committee for Delivery and Legacy for the 2022 FIFA World Cup Qatar Local Organizing Committee.

Career
In 1998, Al-Thawadi gained A-Levels in General Studies and Philosophy from John Leggott College. After that, he graduated from the University of Sheffield with a degree in law. After that, he was appointed Secretary General at Supreme Committee for Delivery and Legacy for the 2022 FIFA World Cup Qatar Local Organizing Committee. 

Al-Thawadi was recognized as one of World Soccer magazine's 2022 People of the Year. He is a fan of French side OL. He is fluent in Spanish, French, English, and Arabic.

Personal life
Al-Thawadi is the son of a Qatari diplomat.

References

2022 FIFA World Cup
Living people
Qatari lawyers
Alumni of the University of Sheffield